Boscawen is a town in Merrimack County, New Hampshire, United States. The population was 3,998 at the 2020 census.

History

The native Pennacook people called the area Contoocook, meaning "place of the river near pines". In March 1697, Hannah Duston and her nurse, Mary Neff, were captured by Abenaki Indians and taken to a temporary village on an island at the confluence of the Contoocook and Merrimack rivers, at the site of what is now Boscawen. In late April, Duston and two other captives killed ten of the Abenaki family members holding them hostage, including six children, and escaped by canoe to Haverhill, Massachusetts.

On June 6, 1733, Governor Jonathan Belcher granted the land to John Coffin and 90 others, most from Newbury, Massachusetts. Settled in 1734, the community soon had a meetinghouse, sawmill, gristmill and ferry across the Merrimack River. A garrison offered protection, but raiding parties during the French and Indian Wars left some dead or carried into captivity.

On April 22, 1760, Contoocook Plantation was incorporated as a town by Governor Benning Wentworth, who named it for Edward Boscawen, the British admiral who distinguished himself at the 1758 Siege of Louisbourg. With a generally level surface, the town provided good farmland, and became noted for its apple, pear and cherry orchards. Bounded by the Merrimack and Contoocook rivers, it had abundant sources of water power for mills.

Industries soon included a cotton mill, a woolen factory, nine sawmills, a gristmill, a saw manufacturer and machine shop, and a chair and match factory. A mill town village developed at Fisherville (now Penacook), which straddled the river border with Concord. In 1846, the Northern Railroad was built through Boscawen, opening the following winter.

Sometime around 1846, the town's postmaster became one of about a dozen in the country to issue provisional postage stamps before the official issue came out in 1847. The stamps were an adaptation of a postmark, simply reading PAID / 5 / CENTS, typeset in blue on a yellowish paper. These are extremely rare; in 2003, the estimated price at auction was US$225,000.

The 1915 Boscawen Public Library was designed by noted Boston architect Guy Lowell.

Geography
The town is drained by the Merrimack River, which forms the town's eastern border, and by the Contoocook River, a tributary.

The town is served by U.S. Route 3 and U.S. Route 4.

Adjacent municipalities 
 Franklin (north)
 Northfield (northeast)
 Canterbury (east)
 Concord (south)
 Webster (west)
 Salisbury (northwest)

Demographics

As of the census of 2000, there were 3,672 people, 1,260 households, and 913 families residing in the town.  The population density was 148.5 people per square mile (57.3/km2).  There were 1,295 housing units at an average density of 52.4 per square mile (20.2/km2).  The racial makeup of the town was 97.74% White, 0.57% African American, 0.30% Native American, 0.46% Asian, 0.16% from other races, and 0.76% from two or more races. Hispanic or Latino of any race were 0.82% of the population.

There were 1,260 households, out of which 35.1% had children under the age of 18 living with them, 55.0% were married couples living together, 12.7% had a female householder with no husband present, and 27.5% were non-families. 21.3% of all households were made up of individuals, and 7.9% had someone living alone who was 65 years of age or older.  The average household size was 2.57 and the average family size was 2.97.

In the town, the population was spread out, with 22.9% under the age of 18, 7.7% from 18 to 24, 29.2% from 25 to 44, 21.7% from 45 to 64, and 18.5% who were 65 years of age or older.  The median age was 39 years. For every 100 females, there were 92.2 males.  For every 100 females age 18 and over, there were 89.4 males.

The median income for a household in the town was $42,524, and the median income for a family was $45,850. Males had a median income of $31,350 versus $23,375 for females. The per capita income for the town was $18,732.  About 5.4% of families and 7.5% of the population were below the poverty line, including 9.8% of those under age 18 and 10.7% of those age 65 or over.

Elektrisola Incorporated is the largest source of employment for Boscawen-area residents.

Sites of interest
 Hannah Duston Memorial State Historic Site
 NH State Veterans Cemetery

Notable people 

 Claire D. Clarke (died 2022), New Hampshire state representative
 Moody Currier (1806–1898), 40th governor of New Hampshire
 John Adams Dix (1798–1879), New York City Postmaster, 24th governor of New York, Major General in the US Civil War
 Marion Dix Sullivan (1802–1860), songwriter, composer
 Moses G. Farmer (1820–1893), electrical engineer, inventor
 William P. Fessenden (1806–1869), US senator, Secretary of the Treasury
 Charles Gordon Greene (1804–1886), journalist
 Nathaniel Greene (1797–1877), journalist
 Lucia Ames Mead (1856–1936), author
 Lyndon A. Smith (1854–1918), politician, Minnesota attorney general
 Bradford N. Stevens (1813–1885), US congressman
 Daniel Webster (1782–1852), US congressman, senator, Secretary of State; unsuccessful presidential candidate

References

External links

 
 Boscawen Public Library
 New Hampshire Economic and Labor Market Information Bureau Profile

 
Towns in Merrimack County, New Hampshire
Towns in New Hampshire
New Hampshire populated places on the Merrimack River